Dream of Love is a 1928 American silent biographical drama film directed by Fred Niblo, and starring Joan Crawford and Nils Asther. The film is based on the 1849 French tragedy Adrienne Lecouvreur by Eugène Scribe and Ernest Legouvé.

In the film, Asther plays Prince Maurice de Saxe and Crawford plays Adrienne Lecouvreur, a Gypsy performer, in a tale of lost love and revenge. Dream of Love is now considered lost.

Plot
Adrienne, a Gypsy girl performing in a traveling carnival, is unable to find true love for herself until she makes the acquaintance of Prince Maurice.  They fall in love, but must part when, for diplomatic reasons, the prince is called upon to make love to the rich wife of an influential duke. Adrienne later becomes a popular stage actress and again meets the prince.  Coincidentally, she is appearing in a play which resembles the sad story of her earlier relationship with the prince. Maurice is struggling to win his throne from a usurping dictator. With Adrienne's help, he dodges an assassination attempt and becomes king.

Cast
Nils Asther as Prince Maurice de Saxe
Joan Crawford as Adrienne Lecouvreur
Aileen Pringle as The Duchess
Warner Oland as The Duke, Current Dictator
Carmel Myers as The Countess
Harry Reinhardt as Count
Harry Myers as The Baron
Alphonse Martell as Michonet
Fletcher Norton as Ivan

Box office
According to MGM records the film earned $339,000 in the US and Canada and $232,000 elsewhere resulting in a profit of $138,000.

References

External links

 

1928 films
1920s historical drama films
1920s biographical drama films
1928 lost films
American historical drama films
American biographical drama films
American silent feature films
Biographical films about actors
American black-and-white films
Films about Romani people
Films set in France
Films set in the 18th century
Cultural depictions of Adrienne Lecouvreur
Films directed by Fred Niblo
American films based on plays
Films based on works by Eugène Scribe
Lost American films
Metro-Goldwyn-Mayer films
Lost drama films
1928 drama films
1920s American films
Silent American drama films